In formal methods of computer science, an apomorphism (from ἀπό — Greek for "apart") is the categorical dual of a paramorphism and an extension of the concept of anamorphism (coinduction). Whereas a paramorphism models primitive recursion over an inductive data type, an apomorphism models primitive corecursion over a coinductive data type.

Origins
The term "apomorphism" was introduced in Functional Programming with Apomorphisms (Corecursion).

See also
 Morphism
 Morphisms of F-algebras
 From an initial algebra to an algebra: Catamorphism
 From a coalgebra to a final coalgebra: Anamorphism
 An anamorphism followed by an catamorphism: Hylomorphism
 Extension of the idea of catamorphisms: Paramorphism

References

Recursion schemes